Gonzalo Molina (born 5 May 1995) is an Argentine male  BMX rider, representing his nation in international competitions. He competed in the time trial event at the 2015 UCI BMX World Championships.

Molina was selected as part of the British cycling team for the 2016 Summer Olympics in Rio de Janeiro, competing in the men's BMX race. After he grabbed a twenty-eighth seed on the opening round with a time of 36.860 and then finished fourth in the quarterfinals, Molina scored a total of 16 placing points to take the sixth spot in his semifinal heat, thus missing out on a chance to compete for the medals at the final race.

References

External links
 
 
 
 
 

1995 births
Living people
BMX riders
Argentine male cyclists
Olympic cyclists of Argentina
Cyclists at the 2016 Summer Olympics
Pan American Games competitors for Argentina
Cyclists at the 2015 Pan American Games
Cyclists at the 2019 Pan American Games
South American Games medalists in cycling
South American Games bronze medalists for Argentina
Competitors at the 2014 South American Games
People from San Juan, Argentina
21st-century Argentine people